Paracymoriza inextricata is a moth in the family Crambidae. It was described by Frederic Moore in 1888. It is found in India and Guangdong, China.

References

Acentropinae
Moths described in 1888